"Come Live With Me" is a song by the British synthpop band Heaven 17, which was released in 1983 as the fourth single from their second album The Luxury Gap. It was written by Glenn Gregory, Ian Craig Marsh and Martyn Ware, and produced by Marsh and Ware (British Electric Foundation) and Greg Walsh. "Come Live with Me" peaked at number 5 in the UK Singles Chart and remained in the top 100 for eleven weeks. It would be the band's last UK top 10 hit until the Brothers in Rhythm remix of "Temptation" in 1992.

Critical reception
On its release, Helen Fitzgerald of Melody Maker felt "Come Live with Me" failed to better the band's previous hit "Temptation", but added that the "moody and sad" song "is still sublime". She described it as "mature", "strong" and "an emotionally wistful relinquishment of lost youth". Max Bell of Number One described it as "an extraordinary choice of single" and added, "After the sublime 'Temptation' this begging letter from an older man to a younger girl seems far too reflective and lyrically top-heavy to strike a common chord." John Shearlaw of Record Mirror felt the single, despite their recent success with "Temptation", "proves that Heaven 17 aren't really in the big league at all". He described the song as "a fine idea (as usual) but one that gets lost entirely with some incredibly clumsy phrasing and unnecessary frippery".

Daryl Jones of the Atherstone Herald commented that it as "not an obvious choice from The Luxury Gap and "finds them in a more relaxed mood following the tense and dramatic 'Temptation'". Robin Eggar of the Daily Mirror felt the song was not as strong as "Temptation" but predicted "it's good enough to make the top ten". Frank Edmonds of the Bury Free Press gave the song a 7.5 out of 10 rating.

Formats
7-inch single
"Come Live with Me" - 3:35 (remixed version)
"Let's All Make a Bomb" (New version) - 5:05

12-inch single
"Come Live with Me" (Extended version) - 4:25
"Let's All Make a Bomb" (New version) - 5:09
"Song With No Name" (New version) - 4:14

Personnel
Heaven 17
 Glenn Gregory - vocals
 Martyn Ware - synthesizers, backing vocals, producer
 Ian Craig Marsh - synthesizers, producer

Additional personnel
 Greg Walsh - producer, engineer

Charts

References

1983 songs
1983 singles
Heaven 17 songs
Songs written by Martyn Ware
Songs written by Glenn Gregory
Songs written by Ian Craig Marsh
Virgin Records singles